Streptomyces reticuliscabiei is a streptomycete bacterium species that is associated with netted scab in potatoes. Its type strain is CFBP 4517T (= ATCC 49173T). It is considered to be part of a cluster together with S. turgidiscabies, however they cause different diseases, the former involved in common scab.

References

Further reading

Whitman, William B., et al., eds. Bergey's manual® of systematic bacteriology. Vol. 5. Springer, 2012.

External links

Type strain of Streptomyces reticuliscabiei at BacDive -  the Bacterial Diversity Metadatabase

reticuliscabiei